Qurbaghestan-e Sofla (also Romanized as Qūrbāghestān-e Soflá; also known as Gherbaghestané Soflá, Gurbaghistan, Qarabāghestān-e Pā’īn, Qarbaghastān-e Pā’īn, Qarbāghestān-e Pā’īn, Qorbāghestān, and Qorbāghestān-e Pā’īn) is a village in Qarah Su Rural District, in the Central District of Kermanshah County, Kermanshah Province, Iran. At the 2006 census, its population was 301, in 62 families.

References 

Populated places in Kermanshah County